KYTC may refer to:

 KYTC (FM), a radio station (102.7 FM) licensed to serve Northwood, Iowa, United States
 Kentucky Transportation Cabinet